Morières-lès-Avignon (literally Morières near Avignon; Provençal: Morieras d'Avinhon) is a commune in the Vaucluse department in the Provence-Alpes-Côte d'Azur region in Southeastern France. It is located just east of Avignon, with a population of 8,563 as of 2018.

Population

See also
Communes of the Vaucluse department

References

Communes of Vaucluse